The Ayden Aces were a minor league baseball team based in Ayden, North Carolina in 1937 and 1938. The Ayden Aces played as exclusively as members of the Class D level Coastal Plain League, hosting home games at the Ayden High School Park.

History
The Ayden "Aces" moniker was first used by a semi–pro team that played in a league named the Coastal Plain League prior to minor league play.

Minor league baseball began in Ayden, North Carolina in 1937. The 1937 Ayden Aces became charter members of the eight–team Class D level Coastal Plain League. Ayden joined the Goldsboro Goldbugs, Greenville Greenies, Kinston Eagles, New Bern Bears, Snow Hill Billies, Tarboro Combs and Williamston Martins in playing the first season of Class D level baseball for the league.

Beginning Coastal Plain League play on May 6, 1937, the Ayden Aces finished the regular season in 5th place. The Aces ended the season with a record of 47–46, finishing in 5th place in the eight–team Coastal Plain League. The Ayden managers in 1937 were Nick Harrison and Alfred "Monk" Joyner, as the Aces finished 12.5 games behind the 1st place Snow Hill Hill Billies in the final standings. The Aces did not qualify for the playoffs, won by Snow Hill. Player/manager Monk Joyner won the league Triple Crown, leading the Coastal Plain League with a .380 batting average, 24 home runs and 97 RBI.

In their final season of play, the Ayden Aces finished last in the 1938 eight–team Coastal Plain League standings. Playing under managers Frank Sidle, Bill Herring, Jim Tatum and Frank Rodgers, the Aces finished the 1938 season with a record of 38–76, placing 8th in the Coastal Plain League. The Aces finished 26.0 games behind the 1st place New Bern Bears in the final standings and did not qualify for the playoffs. Player Doyt Morris of Ayden led the Coastal Plain in batting average, hitting .377. The Ayden minor league franchise permanently folded following the 1938 season. The Aces were replaced by the Wilson Tobos in the 1939 Coastal Plain League.

Ayden, North Carolina has not hosted another minor league team.

The ballpark
The Ayden Aces teams were noted to have played home minor league games at the Ayden High School Park. The ballpark is still in use by the Ayden-Grifton High School teams.

Timeline

Year–by–year records

Notable alumni

Bill Herring (1938, MGR)

See also
Ayden Aces players

References

External links
Baseball Reference

Defunct minor league baseball teams
Baseball teams disestablished in 1938
Baseball teams established in 1937
Defunct baseball teams in North Carolina
Professional baseball teams in North Carolina
Coastal Plain League
Pitt County, North Carolina
Coastal Plain League (minor league) teams